Heddon's Mouth is a rocky cove on the coast of North Devon, England, about a mile down the River Heddon from the Hunter's Inn. It is preserved for the nation by the National Trust.

In previous times it was a popular venue for smugglers, but is now a popular destination for ramblers. In 1885 a Mr E.D. Weedon was awarded the Royal Humane Society’s Bronze Medal for saving the life of Mr T. Groves at the locality. In 1923 a pleasure steamer that had just left Ilfracombe broke its rudder and began to drift out to sea, but was towed to the cove and its 400 passengers safely decanted.

The cove is so isolated that during World War II, a German U-Boat captain was able to allow his men ashore in search of fresh water supplies and relaxation without fear of detection.

References

Exmoor
National Trust properties in Devon
Bays of Devon